The 1998 Prankote massacre was the beheading of 26 Hindus in the villages of Prankote and Dakikote in the Udhampur district (now in Reasi district) of the erstwhile Indian state of Jammu and Kashmir on 17 April, 1998.

Aftermath
It took 10 hours for news to reach the authorities and security forces reached only after a day. Then Jammu & Kashmir Chief Minister Farooq Abdullah said "This a shocking incident. I have seen tragedies earlier, but this was bloodcurdling. No bullets were fired, the villagers were butchered."

The massacre led forced migration of nearly 1,000 people to Reasi, Pouni Thanpal, Chasana and other towns of the district.

In April 2008, the mastermind of this attack - Abdul Haque alias Jahangir, an Islamic terrorist belonging to Hizbul Mujahideen, was killed in an encounter with Indian security forces.

References

Terrorist incidents in India in 1998
Massacres in 1998
Islamic terrorism in India
Massacres in India
Udhampur district
Persecution of Hindus
Persecution by Muslims
1990s in Jammu and Kashmir
Religiously motivated violence in India
Massacres in Jammu and Kashmir
Human rights abuses in Jammu and Kashmir
April 1998 events in Asia
Islamic terrorist incidents in 1998
Massacres of Hindus in Kashmir